Venkatesh (Venky) Shankar is an American marketing professor, consultant and author. He is currently Professor of Marketing, Ford Chair in Marketing & E-Commerce, and Director of Research at the Center for Retailing Studies at Mays Business School, Texas A&M University. He is the co-editor of the Handbook of Marketing Strategy  and the author of Shopper Marketing.

Shankar is widely cited in Marketing Strategy, Digital Strategy, International Marketing, Innovation, New Product Management, Pricing, Retailing and Branding. The Shankar-Spiegel Award  from the Marketing Edge Institute is named in his honor.

Education
Shankar received his Bachelors in Engineering from Indian Institute of Technology Kharagpur in 1984, and he completed his MBA at the Indian Institute of Management Calcutta in 1986. He received his Ph.D. in Marketing at the Kellogg School of Management in Northwestern University in 1995.

Career
Shankar started his academic career at the Robert H. Smith School of Business at University of Maryland, where he served as Co-Director, Quality Enhancement Systems and Teams (QUEST) Program from 1998-2000 and as an associate professor from 2000-2004. He was Visiting Scholar at Sloan School of Management, Massachusetts Institute of Technology from 2001-2002. In 2004, he joined the Mays Business School at Texas A&M University as a professor and Coleman Chair in Marketing. During his time at Mays Business School, Shankar has served as Marketing PhD Program Director from 2006-to 2012. Shankar was Academic Trustee of Marketing Science Institute from 2007 to 2013.

Shankar is currently Director of Research, Center for Retailing Studies, Mays Business School at Texas A&M University. Shankar has consulted with organisations such as Allstate, Capgemini Ernst & Young, Colgate Palmolive, GlaxoSmithKline, Hewlett Packard, HSBC, IBM, Intel, Lockheed Martin, Lucent Technologies, Marriott International, Medtronic, Northrop Grumman, PepsiCo, Philips, and Volvo.

Publications
Shankar has published in academic journals such as the Journal of Marketing Research, Management Science, Marketing Science, Strategic Management Journal, Journal of Marketing, Journal of Public Policy and Marketing, Journal of Retailing, Harvard Business Review, and Sloan Management Review, and in business periodicals such as Wall Street Journal and Financial Times.

Awards
In 2014, earned EMAC-IJRM Steenkamp Award for Long-term Marketing Impact from the International Journal of Research in Marketing. 
In 2014, listed among The World’s Most Influential Scientific Minds. According to Thomson Reuters, “(Researcher with) the greatest numbers of reports officially designated by Essential Science Indicators as Highly Cited Papers—ranking among the top 1% most cited for their subject field and year of publication—between 2002 and 2012.”
In 2013, winner of the Indian Institute of Management, Calcutta (IIMC) Distinguished Alumnus Award. 
In 2013, awarded the Retailing Lifetime Achievement Award by the American Marketing Association for lifetime contributions to retailing research.
In 2012, named as one of the Top 10 experts on innovation management worldwide by the Journal of Product Innovation Management
In 2012, received the Vijay Mahajan Award from the American Marketing Association for his lifetime contributions to marketing strategy
In 2006, received Robert B. Clarke Outstanding Educator Award from the Direct Marketing Educational Foundation for outstanding lifetime contributions to Direct and Interactive Marketing.

External links
Personal Webpage
Department Webpage

References

Living people
American people of Indian descent
Texas A&M University faculty
Kellogg School of Management alumni
Indian Institute of Management Calcutta alumni
IIT Kharagpur alumni
Year of birth missing (living people)